Arthur Lewis Shepherd (7 February 1884 – 14 April 1951) was a Labour Party politician in the United Kingdom.

He was elected as the Member of Parliament (MP) for Darlington at a by-election in 1926, having unsuccessfully contested the seat at the 1924 general election. He was re-elected in 1929, but when Labour split at the 1931 general election as Ramsay MacDonald led the breakaway National Labour group into a Conservative-dominated National Government, he lost his seat to the Conservative candidate Charles Peat.  He stood again in 1935, but lost again by a margin of over 10% of the votes.

References

External links 
 

1884 births
1951 deaths
Labour Party (UK) MPs for English constituencies
UK MPs 1924–1929
UK MPs 1929–1931